Charles E. Beatley, Jr. (May 17, 1916 – December 29, 2003) was an American politician who was the mayor of Alexandria, Virginia. A native of Ohio, Beatley earned his undergraduate degree from Ohio State University in 1938, and received his master's degree in 1947. As a civilian pilot, he flew for Pan American-Grace Airways between college degrees. He also ferried military planes to overseas bases as a civilian pilot during World War II.

Elected to the Alexandria City Council in 1966 as a Democrat, Beatley became mayor the following year, and served until 1976, when he was defeated by former Virginia delegate Frank E. Mann, who ran as an Independent. After retiring from United Airlines, Beatley ran again for mayor at the urging of local Republicans and Democrats, was elected in a landslide, and served until 1985. Beatley became known for preserving Alexandria's historic heritage while revitalizing its business district, as well as for promoting both local and regional public transportation as a board member of the Washington Metropolitan Area Transit Authority.

He lost reelection by 2,000 votes in 1985 to Jim Moran, who would later serve as a member of congress representing the surrounding area. One of his aides, Del Pepper, won election to the city council in 1985 and served for 36 years until 2021.

The Charles E. Beatley, Jr. Central Library of the Alexandria library system and the nearby Charles Beatley Bridge (which crosses Holmes Run) in Alexandria are named in his honor.

References

1916 births
2003 deaths
American people of World War II
Virginia Democrats
Mayors of Alexandria, Virginia
Politicians from Columbus, Ohio
Ohio State University alumni
United Airlines people
Virginia city council members
20th-century American politicians
Commercial aviators